For the United States use of the facility during the Vietnam War see Udorn Royal Thai Air Force Base

Udon Thani International Airport  is an international airport near the city of Udon Thani ( also Udorn Thanee) in Udon Thani Province in the northeast region of Thailand. It currently has domestic flights to and from Bangkok (Suvarnabhumi and Don Mueang), Chiang Mai (on Nok Air), Hat Yai (on Thai Lion Air),  Phuket (on Thai AirAsia), Rayong (on Thai AirAsia), and Ubon Ratchathani (on Nok Air). In 2006, the airport had 677,411 passengers movements and 1,558 MT cargo movements. In 2013, the airport handled 1,325,305 passengers. In 2015, it handled 2,213,689 passengers and 3,678 tonnes of freight. It has been managed by the Department of Airports (DOA).

Udon Thani Airport is the DOA's money-maker, with profits reaching 100 million baht a year.

History

During the Vietnam War the facility was known as Udorn Royal Thai Air Force Base, serving as a front-line base of the United States Air Force and was the Asian headquarters for Air America.

On 8 February 2006, an international group of skydivers from 31 countries called the "World Team" set a world record for the largest freefall formation, a 400-way, over the Udon Thani airport.

Airlines and destinations
Passenger

Military use
As well as being a commercial facility, Udon Thani International Airport is also an active Royal Thai Air Force (RTAF) base, the home of Wing 23, 2nd Air Division Air Combat Command.  The 231 Squadron flies 17 (out of 18 delivered) Dassault/Dornier Alpha Jet airplanes acquired second-hand from the German Air Force and delivered in 2001.  The squadron previously flew F-5A/RF-5A/F-5B Freedom Fighter airplanes.

Plans
Airports of Thailand PCL (AOT) is budgeting 220 billion baht in 2018 for the creation of two new airports and the expansion of four existing airports owned by the Department of Airports. Udon Thani Airport is one of the four slated for expansion and AOT management. AOT intends to build Chiang Mai 2 in Lamphun Province and Phuket Airport 2 in Phang Nga Province. The three other existing airports to be managed by AOT are Chumphon Airport, Sakon Nakhon Airport, and Tak Airport.

References

External links

  Udon Thani International Airport  Homepage 

Airports in Thailand
Buildings and structures in Udon Thani province
Airports established in 1932